Theodore Roberts (October 8, 1861 – December 14, 1928) was an American film and stage actor.

Early life
Roberts was born in San Francisco, California. He was a cousin of the stage actress Florence Roberts. His choice of a career disappointed his mother (who wanted him to become a minister) and his father (who wanted him to learn a trade).

Career
Roberts debuted on stage at the Baldwin Theatre in San Francisco in 1880. He went on to act with a barnstorming troupe on the West Coast but tired of that lifestyle after several years and left acting for a time to command a schooner owned by his father.

On stage in the 1890s he acted with Fanny Davenport in her play Gismonda (1894) and later in The Bird of Paradise (1912). His Broadway career began with We'Uns of Tennessee (1899) and ended with Believe Me Xantippe (1913).

He started his film career in the 1910s in Hollywood, and was often associated in the productions of Cecil B. DeMille. He portrayed Moses in the biblical prologue of DeMille's The Ten Commandments (1923). One of his last film appearances was as the heroine's father in The Cat's Pajamas (1926).

Roberts also performed in vaudeville. After the end of a marriage, he spent six months in a New York jail because he refused to pay alimony.

Death
Roberts died of uremic poisoning in Hollywood, California at age 67 and is buried in Hollywood Forever Cemetery.

Selected filmography

References

External links

Photographs and literature on Theodore Roberts

1861 births
1928 deaths
19th-century American male actors
American male stage actors
20th-century American male actors
American male silent film actors
Male actors from San Francisco
Burials at Hollywood Forever Cemetery
Vaudeville performers